Lost in Space (Part I) is an EP to the German Avantasia album The Scarecrow.

Track listing

Bonus features 
Lost in Space (Video Clip)
Lost in Space (Making of Video Clip)
 Photo Gallery + Poster

Personnel
 Tobias Sammet - Lead vocals, bass 
 Sascha Paeth - Rhythm & lead guitars
 Eric Singer - Drums, vocals (Track 6)
 Michael "Miro" Rodenberg - Keyboards/Orchestration

Guest vocalists
 Jørn Lande (Track 3)
 Bob Catley (Track 4)
 Amanda Somerville (Tracks 1, 4)

Guest musicians
 Henjo Richter - Additional lead guitars (Track 3)

References 

Avantasia albums
2007 EPs